Bde Maka Ska (previously named Lake Calhoun, its former official designation) is the largest lake in Minneapolis, Minnesota, United States, and part of the city's Chain of Lakes. Surrounded by city park land and circled by bike and walking trails, it is popular for many outdoor activities.

Lake and surrounding area

The lake is part of the Grand Rounds National Scenic Byway, connecting with Lake of the Isles on the northeast, Cedar Lake and Brownie Lake on the northwest, and Lake Harriet on the south.  The Minneapolis Park and Recreation Board trail system has a  trail around the lake for bicyclists and skaters and a  trail around it for pedestrians.  Both of these trails connect to the larger trail system via connections to Lake of the Isles and Lake Harriet.  In addition, the Midtown Greenway Trail is located just north of the lake and Lake Street.  The lake itself is popular for canoeing, kayaking, and windsurfing, and it has three swimming beaches.
 

The three beaches are North Beach on the north side of the lake, 32nd Beach on the east, and Thomas Beach on the south.  There is Bde Maka Ska Park and surrounding park land offers parking, picnicking, volleyball, and athletic fields.  It is also home of sailing, hosting the Calhoun Yacht Club, the Minneapolis Sailing Center, as well as local high school teams and the University of St. Thomas Sailing Team.

During 1829–1839, it was the site of the Bdewákhathuŋwaŋ Dakota agricultural village known as Ḣeyate Otuŋwe.  A plaque on the east side of the lake commemorates the mission station built by Samuel and Gideon Pond where they created the first alphabet for the Dakota language at Cloudman's Village.  In 2019, the Bde Maka Ska Public Art Project was completed on the village site. On the west side is The Bakken, an old mansion with medicinal gardens and a library and museum devoted to medical electricity and the history of electromagnetism. The Como-Harriet Streetcar Line operates between the lake and Lake Harriet.

Naming

Historic names
The Dakota originally called the lake  (standardized Lakota/Dakota spelling ; English approximation: Be-DAY Mah-KAH-Ska) meaning 'Lake White Earth', or 'Lake White Bank', a name that probably was given by the Ioway who inhabited the area until the 16th century. Another Dakota name for the lake may have been , which was the name initially adopted by settlers, either as Lake Medoza or in translation as Loon Lake.

Calhoun naming
The United States Secretary of War, John C. Calhoun, sent the Army to survey the area that would surround Fort Snelling in 1817.  Calhoun had also authorized the construction of Fort Snelling, one of the earliest American settlements in the state.  The surveyors named the water body "Lake Calhoun" in his honor, and the Fort Snelling Military Reservation survey map of Lt. James L. Thompson in 1839 shows that name for the lake.

Calhoun–Bde Maka Ska naming dispute
Calhoun's legacy as a slaveowner and pro-slavery politician led critics to question whether he was the best person to be honored. In 2011 the Minneapolis Park and Recreation Board (MPRB) visited the issue. Their legal counsel concluded that the board could not legally change the name, as state law gives that power to the Commissioner of Natural Resources, and then only in the first 40 years after the name was designated. Following the Charleston church shooting in June 2015, a fresh drive to change the name started via an online petition and the Park Board indicated it would look into whether they could change the lake's name through state action. At the time, the Minneapolis Star Tribune published an article quoting Calhoun's views on the black race:

The number of deaf and dumb, blind, idiots and insane of the Negroes in the States that have changed the ancient relations between the races [and are no longer slaves] is one out of every ninety-six; while in the States adhering to it [slavery], it is one out of every six hundred and sixty-one; being nearly six to one against the free blacks in the same state

as well as his actions in ordering the flogging of one his own slaves.  In fall 2015 the board added the Dakota name to signage below the official name. In March 2016, an advisory group decided by majority vote to urge the MPRB to restore the lake's former name. There was also a proposal to rename the lake for Senator Paul Wellstone, who is buried in nearby Lakewood Cemetery.

In 2017, the Minneapolis Park Board voted unanimously to recommend changing the lake's name back to Bde Maka Ska and the Hennepin County commissioners agreed. In January 2018, the Minnesota Department of Natural Resources (DNR) made Bde Maka Ska the official name in Minnesota. To change it at the federal level, the state submitted materials to the U.S. Board on Geographic Names, which approved the change in June 2018. Park signs around the lake use only the name Bde Maka Ska.

On April 29, 2019, the Minnesota Court of Appeals reversed the decision of the DNR, holding that a name that had been in use more than 40 years could only be changed by the legislature. The MPRB  stated they would continue to keep the signage of Bde Maka Ska at the lake and Minneapolis Mayor Jacob Frey said, "I will continue to call Bde Maka Ska by its rightful name. That was the lake's name before people who look like me renamed it to honor a slavery apologist and as far as I'm concerned that is still its name today". The DNR appealed the court decision, and also released a statement confirming that the federal Board on Geographic Names (BGN) had adopted Bde Maka Ska as the lake's official name. Executive secretary of the U.S. Board on Geographic Names Lou Yost said, "State legislation (or court ruling) is not binding on the Federal Government. The name at the Federal level will remain Bde Maka Ska as was approved at the BGN's June 21, 2018 meeting".  The Minnesota Court of Appeals decision was appealed to the Minnesota Supreme Court, which heard oral argument November 13, 2019.  On May 13, 2020, the Minnesota Supreme Court ruled that the Minnesota Department of Natural Resources had the authority to rename Lake Calhoun as Bde Maka Ska, ruling that the law restricting renaming only applied to county boards, not to the DNR.

Wildlife

The lake contains black crappie, bluegill, bowfin, common carp, hybrid sunfish, largemouth bass, northern pike, pumpkinseed, tiger muskellunge, walleye, white sucker, and yellow perch. Some fish consumption guideline restrictions have been placed on the lake's bluegill, crappie, largemouth bass, northern pike, walleye, and white sucker due to mercury and perfluorooctanesulfonic acid contamination.

The Minneapolis Park and Recreation website lists the lake as one of the best in the city for ice fishing walleye, northern pike, and crappies.

Zebra mussels, an aquatic invasive species, were found in the lake in 2018.

See also
 List of lakes in Minneapolis
List of shared-use paths in Minneapolis

References

External links

 Minnesota DNR Lake Information Report
 Minneapolis Park and Recreation Board: Bde Maka Ska Park

Bde Maka Ska
Parks in Minneapolis
Shared-use paths in Minneapolis
Dakota toponyms